Khunjerab Pass is a  mountain pass in the Karakoram Mountains, in a strategic position on the northern border of Pakistan (Gilgit–Baltistan's Hunza and Nagar Districts) and on the southwest border of China (Xinjiang). 
 is a  mountain pass at    
 near Khunjerab Pass.

Etymology 
Its name is derived from two words of the local Wakhi language: "khun" means blood and "jerab" means a creek coming from a spring or waterfall.

Notability 

The Khunjerab Pass is the highest paved international border crossing in the world and the highest point on the Karakoram Highway. The roadway across the pass was completed in 1982, and has superseded the unpaved Mintaka and Kilik passes as the primary passage across the Karakoram Range. The choice of Khunjerab Pass for Karakoram Highway was decided in 1966: China citing the fact that Mintaka would be more susceptible to air strikes, recommended the steeper Khunjerab Pass instead.

The Chinese port of entry is located  along the road from the pass in Tashkurgan County.

The long, relatively flat pass is often snow-covered during the winter season and as a consequence is generally closed for heavy vehicles from November 30 to May 1 and for all vehicles from December 30 to April 1.

The reconstructed Karakoram Highway passes through Khunjerab Pass.

Since June 1, 2006, there has been a daily bus service across the boundary from Gilgit to Kashgar, Xinjiang.

This is one of the international borders where left-hand traffic (Pakistan-administered Gilgit-Baltistan) changes to right-hand traffic (China) and vice versa.

Highest ATM in the world 
The Pakistani side features the highest ATM in the world, administered by the National Bank of Pakistan and 1LINK.

Railway 

In 2007, consultants were hired to evaluate the construction of a railway through this pass to connect China with transport in Pakistani-administered Gilgit-Baltistan. However, no progress has been made thereafter and this project is also not part of the current CPEC plan.

Gallery

See also 
 China–Pakistan border
 Mustagh Pass
 Sost
 Khunjerab National Park
 Karakoram Highway
 Gilgit–Baltistan
 Nathu La
 Abra del Acay

References

Citations

Sources 

 Curzon, George Nathaniel. 1896. The Pamirs and the Source of the Oxus. Royal Geographical Society, London. Reprint: Elibron Classics Series, Adamant Media Corporation. 2005.  (pbk);  (hbk).
 King, John 1989. Karakoram Highway : the high road to China. Hawthorn, Victoria, Lonely Planet Publications. 
 Episode 13/30 of the NHK television series The Silk Road, a series originally shown in Japan in the early 1980s.

External links 
 

Extreme points of Earth
Mountain passes of China
Mountain passes of Pakistan
Mountain passes of Gilgit-Baltistan
Mountain passes of Xinjiang
China–Pakistan border crossings
Mountain passes of the Karakoram
Sites along the Silk Road
Tashkurgan Tajik Autonomous County